Eva-Maria Hoch (born 6 August 1984) is a retired Austrian tennis player.

In her career, she won seven doubles titles on the ITF circuit. On 26 November 2007, she reached her best singles ranking of world number 491. On 8 October 2007, she peaked at number 354 in the WTA doubles rankings.

Hoch made her WTA Tour debut at the 2007 Gastein Ladies in both singles and doubles.

ITF finals

Singles (0–1)

Doubles (7–4)

References

External links
 
 

1984 births
Living people
Austrian female tennis players